Attainment may refer to:

Status attainment, in society
Educational attainment
Attainment to standards in air pollution, Non-attainment area (US)
Attainment (album), Charles Brackeen, 1987